Dilruba Z. Ara (born 20 November 1957) is a Swedish Bangladeshi writer, novelist, artist, educator and translator.

Background
Ara was born into a distinguished literary family in Bangladesh. Her father, Shahed Ali, was a Language Movement veteran, translator and Bangla Academy award-winning author of Gabriel's Wings. Her mother, Professor Chemon Ara, now retired, is also an acknowledged author and Language Movement veteran.

Career 
 First novel A List of Offences was published in 2006.
 Second novel Blame was published in 2015.
 Collection of stories Detached Belonging was published in 2016.
 Translation work Selected Short Stories by Shahed Ali was published in 2006.

Education 
Bachelor of Education: Lund University, Sweden.

Alma Mater: Gothenburg University, Sweden.

Bibliography

Books 
 A List of Offences (2006).
 Blame (2015).
 Detached Belonging (2016).

Short stories 
Published in Chattahoochee Review, Drunken Boat, Asia Writes, Democratic World Magazine, Swedish Institute, The Daily Star, Shipwrights Review and Vista.

Personal life 
Ara moved to Sweden in 1978 and has lived in the university town of Lund since 2007. Her son, Navid, now an architect, lives and works in Malmö. Her daughter, Tania, a student at the Royal Institute of Technology, lives in Stockholm. Ara travels to Dhaka frequently, where her mother Professor Chemon Ara still lives in their family home in Banani. Her father Shahed Ali passed away in 2001.

References

External links
 Official website
 Interview with Dilruba Z. Ara at The Daily Observer, Bangladesh
 Published works at WorldCat Identities
 Princeton University Library Catalogue
 Dilruba Z. Ara speaks at Independent University, Bangladesh
 Books by Dilruba Z. Ara at The University Press Limited
 Book review (La Lista de Ofensas) at Oceano Publishing House, Mexico
 Book review (La Lista de Ofensas) at La Librería de Javier, Madrid
 Bangladeshi Writers Abroad at Bangladesh Circle
 The Mosque-Yard Imam by Dilruba Z. Ara at Democratic World, India

1957 births
Living people
Writers from Dhaka
Bangladeshi women writers